Put Ilyicha is a rural locality (a settlement) and the administrative center of Priozyornoye Rural Settlement, Pallasovsky District, Volgograd Oblast, Russia. The population was 759 as of 2010. There are 13 streets.

Geography 
Put Ilyicha is located 90 km south of Pallasovka (the district's administrative centre) by road. Vengelovka is the nearest rural locality.

References 

Rural localities in Pallasovsky District